Viggo Bielefeldt  (16 October 1851 – 17 December 1909) was a Danish composer.

References
This article was initially translated from the Danish Wikipedia.

Danish composers
Male composers
1851 births
1909 deaths
19th-century male musicians
19th-century musicians
Burials at Hellerup Cemetery